The 1962 Cincinnati Bearcats football team represented University of Cincinnati during the 1962 NCAA University Division football season. The Bearcats, led by head coach Chuck Studley, participated in the Missouri Valley Conference (MVC) and played their home games at Nippert Stadium.

Schedule

References

Cincinnati
Cincinnati Bearcats football seasons
Cincinnati Bearcats football